Major General Sir Michael Frederick Hobbs  (born 28 February 1937) is a former commander in the British Army and now a charity director and Governor of the Military Knights of Windsor.

Early life
Hobbs was born 28 February 1937. He was educated at Eton College.

Military career
Hobbs was commissioned into the Grenadier Guards on 14 April 1956 as a second lieutenant to fulfil his national service obligation. He was promoted to lieutenant on 28 February 1958 and was removed from the national service list. On 28 February 1964, he was promoted to captain, and to major on 31 December 1969. He served on the Directing Staff of Staff College, Camberley between 1974 and 1977. In 1979, during The Troubles, he was posted to Northern Ireland.

On 30 June 1980, Hobbs was promoted to colonel, and to brigadier on 31 December 1981. He was appointed Commander of the 39th Infantry Brigade in 1982. He was posted again to Northern Ireland in 1983 as part of the Staff. He was appointed Director of Army Public Relations at the Ministry of Defence and served there from January 1984 to July 1985. He was General Officer Commanding 4th Armoured Division between December 1985 and November 1987. On 29 March 1986, he was promoted to major-general with seniority from 22 June 1984.

Hobbs retired on 23 February 1988.

Later life

Sir Michael has also held the positions of both Director of the Duke of Edinburgh's Award between 1988 and 1998 and a Director of the Outward Bound Trust since 1995. He is a director of the London Law Trust, a grant making charitable trust, and has served as the Deputy Chairman of the Development Committee of the College of St. George. 

Sir Michael became the Governor of the Military Knights of Windsor in 2000 and retired from this post in July 2012.

Awards and decorations

Personal life
Hobbs is married to Tessa. Lady Hobbs is an internationally renowned garden designer. In 2000, his son William Hobbs was jailed for killing a cyclist whilst drink-driving. The 21-year-old was sentenced to four and a half years.

Hobb's grandmother was a lady in waiting to Queen Mary wife of George V.

References

1937 births
Living people
Military Knights of Windsor
People educated at Eton College
Academics of the Staff College, Camberley
British Army major generals
Commanders of the Order of the British Empire
Knights Commander of the Royal Victorian Order
Grenadier Guards officers
British military personnel of The Troubles (Northern Ireland)